Anthony Collins (born 9 June 1949) is a New Zealand cricketer. He played in one first-class and four List A matches for Canterbury from 1976 to 1978.

See also
 List of Canterbury representative cricketers

References

External links
 

1949 births
Living people
New Zealand cricketers
Canterbury cricketers
Cricketers from Christchurch